In enzymology, a 20-α-hydroxysteroid dehydrogenase is an enzyme that catalyzes the chemical reaction

17alpha,20alpha-dihydroxypregn-4-en-3-one + NAD(P)+  17alpha-hydroxyprogesterone + NAD(P)H + H+

The 3 substrates of this enzyme are 17alpha,20alpha-dihydroxypregn-4-en-3-one, NAD+, and NADP+, whereas its 4 products are 17-alpha-hydroxyprogesterone, NADH, NADPH, and H+.

This enzyme belongs to the family of oxidoreductases, specifically those acting on the CH-OH group of donor with NAD+ or NADP+ as acceptor. The systematic name of this enzyme class is 20alpha-hydroxysteroid:NAD(P)+ 20-oxidoreductase. Other names in common use include 20alpha-hydroxy steroid dehydrogenase, 20alpha-hydroxy steroid dehydrogenase, 20alpha-HSD, and 20alpha-HSDH. This enzyme participates in c21-steroid hormone metabolism.

20alpha-HSD has been initially described as a progesterone metabolizing enzyme of the ovary. On a functional level, ovarian 20alpha-HSD is actively involved in the control of progesterone homeostasis in pregnancy of rats and mice. While 20alpha-HSD expression and activity is downregulated in the corpus luteum of pregnancy, 24 hrs prior to parturition ovarian 20alpha-HSD activity is acutely stimulated. Accordingly, in mice with targeted deletion of the 20alpha-HSD gene, progesterone blood concentration remain high throughout pregnancy which results in a delay of 2–4 days in parturition. Indicating that expression of 20alpha-HSD activity is mandatory for the induction of parturition through reduction of progesterone blood concentration. In mice, 20alpha-HSD is also expressed in the adrenals, kidneys, brain, thymus, T cells and bone marrow. Its induction in hematopoietic cells was used as an assay for the identification of T cell derived factor interleukin-3. In addition, the enzyme reduces and inactivates 17-deoxycorticosterone, the precursor of aldosterone and corticosterone.

Structural studies

AKR1C1, AKR1C2, and AKR1C3

Enzymes
AKR1C1 has high catalytic efficiency as a 20α-HSD and AKR1C2 and AKR1C3 efficiently catalyze this reaction as well.

See also
 3β(or 20α)-hydroxysteroid dehydrogenase

References

Further reading

 
 
 
 
 
 
 
 
 
 

EC 1.1.1
NADPH-dependent enzymes
NADH-dependent enzymes
Enzymes of known structure